Founded in 1984, Sage Hospitality is one of the leading hotel management and development companies in the United States.

History
Zack Neumeyer, Walter Isenberg, and Steve Mikol founded Sage in 1984 in Denver, Colorado. Sage manages and invests in hotels and larger real estate developments nationwide. Sage has developed and operated more than 400 hotels in 40 states. Sage Restaurant Group has 11 distinct concept restaurants. Isenberg is CEO and President, Neumeyer is Chairman and Peter Karpinski is co-founder and CEO of Sage Restaurant Group.

Sage Hospitality focuses on hotel and restaurant management services. At Sage’s home base in Denver, management services include: payroll, accounting, finance, IT support, HR and development. Sage also has a real estate development department which guides new projects and transitions. Recently, Sage began working more on the independent side of hotels, developing, trademarking and expanding brands exclusive to the company such as Halcyon and The Maven Hotel, both currently located only in Denver.

SAGE Managed

 AC Hotels by Marriott
 Autograph Collection by Marriott
 CURIO Collection by Hilton
 DoubleTree Hotel by Hilton
 Hilton Garden Inn
 Hilton Hotels
 Homewood Suites by Hilton
 HYATT House
 Marriott Hotels
 JW Marriott
 Courtyard by Marriott
 Renaissance Hotels
 Ritz-Carlton
 SpringHill Suites by Marriott
 The Luxury Collection
 Westin

SAGE Independents

 The Oxford Hotel
 Hotel Commonwealth
 The Crawford Hotel
 The Rally
 CatBird
 The Maven Hotel at Dairy Block
 The Hotel Landing

References

External links
 Sage Hospitality
 Sage Restaurant Group
Maps
 SAGE CORPORATE MAP
 SAGE PROPERTY MAP

Companies established in 1984
Hospitality companies of the United States
Companies based in Denver